A list of animated feature films released in 2001

Highest-grossing animated films of the year

See also
 List of animated television series of 2001

Notes

References

 Feature films
2001
2001-related lists